Marsiling Secondary School (MSS) is a co-educational government secondary school in Marsiling, Singapore. It was founded in January 2000. MSS is located along Marsiling Road, Singapore, having been temporarily housed at the premises of Woodgrove Secondary School from 2000 to late 2001, due to prolonged delays in construction of the Marsiling campus when the company handling the construction failed in mid-2000.

History
MSS was inaugurated as a result of a shortage of secondary schools, especially in anticipation of the record number of primary-school leavers in January 2000. Choy Chee Meh was appointed the first principal of MSS, and acquisition of land at the current site began shortly after the decision to establish the school. Primary-school leavers had little interest in choosing MSS at first, compared to the other long-established secondary schools in the Woodlands area.

MSS was involved in the three-year Apple-MOE Collaboration in which Apple Inc.'s Macintosh computers were introduced, and the education model used in the United States devised by educators and Apple Inc. was applied. During this period, MSS hosted three Edu-Pi camps, a two-day educational workshop to encourage the use of Apple Inc.'s products such as iMovie and the Mac OS.

Merger
MSS merged with Si Ling Secondary School with effect from 1 January 2017 due to its small student population. The abbreviation of the school changed from MSL to MSS. Si Ling Secondary is now closed from 1 January 2017 since its opening in 1980.

References

External links
 MOE Infomap of Marsiling Secondary School
 School locality map
 Ministry of Education, Singapore

Secondary schools in Singapore
Educational institutions established in 2000
Woodlands, Singapore
2000 establishments in Singapore